Jerry Vasto (born February 12, 1992) is an American professional baseball pitcher who is currently a free agent. He has previously played in Major League Baseball (MLB) for the Colorado Rockies and Kansas City Royals.

Early career
A native of Atlantic Highlands, New Jersey, Vasto attended Henry Hudson Regional High School where he played baseball. After graduating, Vasto played collegiate baseball at Felician University, the only college to offer him a scholarship.

Career

Colorado Rockies
Vasto was selected by the Colorado Rockies in the 24th round of the 2014 Major League Baseball draft, and he signed. He made his professional debut that same year with the Tri-City Dust Devils, pitching one scoreless inning and compiling one strikeout. In 2015, he made 46 relief appearances for the Asheville Tourists where he was 2-4 with a 2.93 earned run average, and held opponents to a .199 average. This season also helped him earn his first Minor League All Star Appearance. In 2016, he was called up to play with the Modesto Nuts and Hartford Yard Goats. In 56 relief appearance, Jerry compiled a combined 4-4 record with 70 strikeouts and a 2.26 earned run average and earned his second Minor League All Star appearance. Jerry was invited to participate in the Arizona Fall League for the 2016 season, where he struggled and had an earned run average of 8.31 in 8 2/3 innings pitched. Vasto was called up and spent 2017 with the Albuquerque Isotopes, where at one point in the season he had major success and ranked #30 in the Rockies top prospects list. However, due to injuries and major second half struggles, his stats declined and he pitched to a 3-3 record, a 6.88 earned run average, and a 1.68 walks plus hits divided by innings pitched in 53.2 relief innings. He began 2018 with the Albuquerque Isotopes, where he improved tremendously and compiled a 3.16 earned run average with 44 strikeouts in 37 relief appearances.

Major league career
Vasto was called up to the majors for the first time on June 10, 2018, and he made his major league debut that same day against the Arizona Diamondbacks. Jerry recorded his first major league strikeout against the Arizona Diamondbacks outfielder Jon Jay, but overall struggled in his debut as he allowed 3 hits, 3 earned runs, and a walk in only 2/3 innings pitched. He was optioned back to Albuquerque on June 14.

Kansas City Royals

On August 31, 2018, Vasto was traded to the Kansas City Royals in exchange for catcher Drew Butera. Jerry made one appearance with the Omaha Storm Chasers before getting called up on September 4. He made his debut that same night and recorded his first Royals strikeout against Cleveland Indians outfielder Brandon Guyer. Jerry finished his 2018 Royals season with three strikeouts and a 2.45 earned run average in 3 2/3 innings pitched. Vasto finished his first major league season with four strikeouts and an 8.31 earned run average in 4 1/3 innings pitched.

Chicago Cubs
On October 31, 2018, Vasto was claimed off waivers by the Chicago Cubs. On November 20, Vasto was outrighted off of the Cubs roster. He became a free agent on November 2, 2020. On November 16, 2020, Vasto resigned a minor league deal with the Chicago Cubs. On March 29, 2021, Vasto was released by the Cubs.

References

External links

1992 births
Living people
Henry Hudson Regional High School alumni
People from Atlantic Highlands, New Jersey
Sportspeople from Monmouth County, New Jersey
Baseball players from New Jersey
Major League Baseball pitchers
Colorado Rockies players
Kansas City Royals players
Tri-City Dust Devils players
Asheville Tourists players
Modesto Nuts players
Hartford Yard Goats players
Salt River Rafters players
Albuquerque Isotopes players
Omaha Storm Chasers players